2011 Auckland Open was a darts tournament that took place in Auckland, New Zealand on 17 September 2011.

Results

Men

Women

References

2011 in darts
2011 in New Zealand sport
Darts in New Zealand
September 2011 sports events in New Zealand